Pseudophenmetrazine is a psychostimulant compound of the morpholine class. It is the N-demethylated and cis-configured analogue of phendimetrazine as well as the cis-configured stereoisomer of phenmetrazine. In addition, along with phenmetrazine, it is believed to be one of the active metabolites of phendimetrazine, which itself is inactive and behaves merely as a prodrug. Relative to phenmetrazine, pseudophenmetrazine is of fairly low potency, acting as a modest releasing agent of norepinephrine (EC50 = 514 nM), while its (+)-enantiomer is a weak releaser of dopamine (EC50 = 1,457 nM) whereas its (−)-enantiomer is a weak reuptake inhibitor of dopamine (Ki = 2,691 nM); together as a racemic mixture with the two enantiomers combined, pseudophenmetrazine behaves overall more as a dopamine reuptake inhibitor (Ki = 2,630 nM), possibly due to the (+)-enantiomer blocking the uptake of the (−)-enantiomer into dopaminergic neurons and thus preventing it from inducing dopamine release. Neither enantiomer has any significant effect on serotonin reuptake or release (both Ki = >10,000 nM and EC50 = >10,000 nM, respectively).

See also 
 Phenmetrazine
 Phendimetrazine

References 

Norepinephrine-dopamine releasing agents
Phenylmorpholines
Substituted amphetamines
Stimulants